The Hecke algebra of a finite group is the algebra spanned by the double cosets HgH of a subgroup H of a finite group G. It is a special case of a Hecke algebra of a locally compact group.

Definition 
Let F be a field of characteristic zero, G a finite group and H a subgroup of G. Let  denote the
group algebra of G: the space of F-valued functions on G with the multiplication given by convolution. An (F-valued) function on G/H determines and is determined by a function on G that is invariant under the right action of H. That is, there is the natural identification:

Similarly, there is the identification

given by sending a G-linear map f to the value of f evaluated at the characteristic function of H. For each double coset , let  denote the characteristic function of it. Then those 's form a basis of R.

Application in representation theory 

See also 
Gelfand pair

References 
Claudio Procesi (2007) Lie Groups: an approach through invariants and representations, Springer, .
Mark Reeder (2011) Notes on representations of finite groups, notes.

Algebras
Representation theory of Lie groups